German submarine U-759 was a Type VIIC U-boat of Nazi Germany's Kriegsmarine during World War II. The submarine was laid down on 15 November 1940 at the Kriegsmarinewerft yard at Wilhelmshaven, launched on 30 May 1942, and commissioned on 15 August 1942 under the command of Oberleutnant zur See Rudolf Friedrich.

Design
German Type VIIC submarines were preceded by the shorter Type VIIB submarines. U-759 had a displacement of  when at the surface and  while submerged. She had two shafts and two  propellers.

U-759 was fitted with five  torpedo tubes (four fitted at the bow and one at the stern), fourteen torpedoes, one  SK C/35 naval gun, 220 rounds, and two twin  C/30 anti-aircraft guns. The boat had a complement of between forty-four and sixty.

Service history
After training with 5th U-boat Flotilla at Kiel, Germany, on 1 February 1943 U-759 was transferred to 9th U-boat Flotilla, based in Brest, France, for front-line service. She sailed on two combat patrols and sank two ships totalling . U-759 was sunk east of Jamaica on 15 July 1943 by depth charges from a US Navy Mariner patrol bomber. All hands were lost.

First patrol
U-759 first sailed from Kiel on 2 February 1943, and out into the Atlantic, south of Greenland. She had no successes, and arrived at Lorient, France on 14 March after 41 days.

Second patrol
U-759 left Lorient on 7 June 1943 and sailed across the Atlantic to the Caribbean Sea.

Two days later, on 7 July, the U-boat torpedoed and sank the 9,251 GRT Dutch cargo ship Poelau Roebiah, in convoy TAG-70, east of Jamaica. All but two of the 68 crew, along with 24 armed guards and 31 US passengers abandoned ship in four lifeboats and were later rescued. After sinking the Dutch ship the U-boat was pursued and attacked by the United States destroyer , but escaped. The next day, 8 July, U-759 was spotted and attacked by a United States Navy scout aircraft. Allied surface ships attacked for seven hours, but the U-boat evaded them and escaped unharmed.

Fate
U-759 was sunk on 15 July 1943 by depth charges from a US Navy Mariner aircraft from Squadron VP-32 in the Caribbean, in approximate position . All 47 crew were lost.

Wolfpacks
U-759 took part in one wolfpack, namely:
 Neptun (18 February – 3 March 1943)

Summary of raiding history

References

Bibliography

External links

German Type VIIC submarines
U-boats commissioned in 1942
U-boats sunk in 1943
U-boats sunk by depth charges
U-boats sunk by US aircraft
World War II submarines of Germany
World War II shipwrecks in the Caribbean Sea
1942 ships
Ships built in Wilhelmshaven
Ships lost with all hands
Maritime incidents in July 1943